Patience Avre (born 10 June 1976) is a Nigerian former football forward who played for the Nigeria women's national football team at the 1995 FIFA Women's World Cup, 1999 FIFA Women's World Cup and 2003 FIFA Women's World Cup as well as the  2000 Summer Olympics.

See also
 Nigeria at the 2000 Summer Olympics

References

External links
 
 

1976 births
Living people
Nigerian women's footballers
Place of birth missing (living people)
Footballers at the 2000 Summer Olympics
Olympic footballers of Nigeria
Women's association football forwards
1995 FIFA Women's World Cup players
Nigeria women's international footballers
1999 FIFA Women's World Cup players
2003 FIFA Women's World Cup players